1994–2006 Chaos Years is a retrospective compilation album from the heavy metal band Strapping Young Lad. The album contains tracks from all of the band's studio albums, as well as a DVD with live footage and music videos. The album had a European release on March 31, 2008.

All of the songs were hand-picked by the band members and remastered by Devin Townsend.

Track listing

DVD

Personnel
Gene Hoglan – percussion, drums
Will Knapp – production
Dr. Kevin McBride – production
Jamie Meyer – keyboards
Jim Parsons – production
Marcus Rogers – direction, production
Jed Simon – guitar
Doug Spangenberg – direction
Byron Stroud – bass
Devin Townsend – guitar, vocals, production, mastering, video production, track compilation
Adrian White – drums
Dave Young Orchestra – keyboards

Charts

References

Strapping Young Lad compilation albums
2008 compilation albums
2008 video albums
2008 live albums
Live video albums
Music video compilation albums
Century Media Records compilation albums
Century Media Records video albums
Strapping Young Lad video albums
Strapping Young Lad live albums
Century Media Records live albums
Albums produced by Devin Townsend